Dubovac may refer to:
 Dubovac, Kovin, a village in Kovin municipality, Serbia
 Dubovac Castle, a castle near Karlovac, Croatia

See also
Dubovec (disambiguation)